The Hank Aaron State Trail is a  rail trail in Milwaukee County, Wisconsin.

The trail is named for former Milwaukee Braves and Milwaukee Brewers right fielder Hank Aaron, and was built on a former roadbed of the Chicago, Milwaukee, St. Paul and Pacific Railway.

History
Following a recommendation by then-mayor John Norquist's Bicycle Task Force to develop an east-west trail through the Menomonee Valley, the trail opened in 2000 with a length of only a third of a mile, near American Family Field, though a segment between 13th Street and 25th Street was added shortly after. In August 2006, the trail stretched from Lakeshore State Park in the east to American Family Field in the west. In 2010, a four-mile westward extension to 94th Place was completed, setting the total trail length to ten miles. In November 2011, the trail was expanded from 94th Place to Underwood Parkway, though this section was composed of compacted gravel. In 2012, a one-mile spur connecting to Mitchell Park Horticultural Conservatory was added. In 2014, a ramp and stairway were added to the trail near 6th Street to allow easy access to street level. In 2018, the compacted gravel section of the trail west of 94th Place was paved with the completion of the reconstruction of the Zoo Interchange.

In May 2019, installation began for People of the Road, a set of metal sculptures on the trail honoring the workers of the Milwaukee Road. By July 2020, installation of all five sculptures was complete.

In 2020, the trail was designated part of U.S. Bicycle Route 30.

Route
The trail begins on the shore of Lake Michigan in Lakeshore State Park. The trail travels west through Milwaukee, passing by the Harley-Davidson Museum, Potawatomi Hotel & Casino, American Family Field, and the Wisconsin State Fair Park. The trail ends at the Oak Leaf Trail in Wauwatosa, Wisconsin.

Access
The trail is open to walkers, joggers, bicyclists, and in-line skaters. Much of the trail is accessible to people with disabilities.

References

External links

Official website
Wisconsin Department of Transportation U.S. Bike Route (USBR) 30 and USBR 230

Rail trails in Wisconsin
Protected areas of Milwaukee County, Wisconsin